Jon Iñarritu Gartzia (born 28 March 1979) is a Basque politician and a member of the Congress of Deputies of Spain. He was previously a member of the Senate of Spain.

Early life
Iñarritu was born on 28 March 1979 in Leioa, Basque Country. He has a law degree from the University of the Basque Country and a master's degree in international and European law from the Pierre Mendès-France University.

Career
Iñarritu was a founding member of Aralar and vice president of Eurobaskek (Basque Council of the European Movement). He contested the 2011 general election as an Amaiur electoral alliance candidate in the Province of Biscay and was elected to the Congress of Deputies. At the 2015 general election he was placed 2nd on the EH Bildu electoral alliance's list of candidates in the Province of Biscay but the alliance only managed to win one seat in the province and as a result he failed to get re-elected to the Congress of Deputies.

At the 2016 general election Iñarritu was placed 3rd on the EH Bildu's list of candidates in the Province of Biscay but the party only managed to win one seat in the province and as a result he failed to get re-elected to the Congress of Deputies. In December 2016 he was appointed to the Senate of Spain by the Basque Parliament.

Iñarritu contested the 2019 general election as an EH Bildu electoral alliance candidate in the Province of Gipuzkoa and was re-elected to the Congress of Deputies.

Electoral history

References

External links

1979 births
Amaiur politicians
Aralar (Basque political party) politicians
EH Bildu politicians
Living people
Members of the 10th Congress of Deputies (Spain)
Members of the 13th Congress of Deputies (Spain)
Members of the 12th Senate of Spain
People from Greater Bilbao
Grenoble Alpes University alumni
University of the Basque Country alumni
Members of the 14th Congress of Deputies (Spain)
Spanish expatriates in France